The Ferrino is a kit sports car based on a Ferrari Dino, using a tubular chassis and glassfiber body. It was in production in South Africa in the early 1980s. The power train consisted of an Audi 5/6 speed gearbox and the popular Ford Essex V6 engine in a mid-mounted configuration. Some owners preferred fitting Ford or Chevy V8 engines.

A second, less popular version was based on a Volkswagen Beetle chassis and suspension. The Volkswagen-based Ferrinos were available in hard top and cabriolet. Although Ford Essex V6 engines were the preferred choice for a power plant, stock Volkswagen Beetle engines and Mazda rotary engines were also used.

Kit cars